The 2013 Southeastern Conference football season began on August 29 with Ole Miss visiting Vanderbilt, and will conclude with the Allstate Sugar Bowl and/or the BCS National Championship Game in early January. The 2013 season was considered to be a "bridge" season and was not based on any past or future formatting. New inter-division rivalry games between Texas A&M-South Carolina and Arkansas-Missouri did not take place until the 2014 season.

Preseason

Preseason All-SEC
2013 Pre-season Coaches All-SEC

Rankings

Regular season

All times Eastern time.  SEC teams in bold.

Rankings reflect that of the AP poll for that week until week eight when the BCS rankings will be used.

Week One 

Players of the week:

Week Two 

Players of the week:

Week Three 

Players of the week:

Week Four 

Players of the week:

Week Five 

Players of the week:

Week Six 

Players of the week:

Week Seven 

Players of the week:

Week Eight 

Players of the week:

Week Nine 

Players of the week:

Week Ten 

Players of the week:

Week Eleven 

Players of the week:

Week Twelve 

Players of the week:

Week Thirteen 

Players of the week:

Week Fourteen 

Players of the week:

SEC Championship

SEC vs AQ-conference matchups

This is a list of the BCS-league teams the SEC plays in the non-conference (Rankings from the AP Poll):

Bowl games

(Rankings from final BCS poll)

Awards and honors

All-SEC Teams
The Southeastern Conference coaches voted for the All-SEC teams after the regular season concluded.  Prior to the 2013 SEC Championship Game the teams were released. Alabama placed the most representatives on the 2013 All-Southeastern Conference Coaches’ Football Team, the league office announced Tuesday. Alabama had nine total members, including a league-leading five representatives on the first team. LSU followed with eight total selections.

Twelve of the 14 SEC schools had a member on the first-team All-SEC squad. Alabama led with five, followed by Texas A&M with four. Georgia and SEC Champion Auburn each placed three total members on the first team.  Every SEC school was represented by at least one member on the All-SEC teams, including seven institutions with four or more All-SEC selections each.

Coaches were not permitted to vote for their own players.

National awards
 A. J. McCarron, Alabama – Maxwell Award (outstanding player)
 Gus Malzahn, Auburn – Home Depot Award (coach of the year)
 A. J. McCarron, Alabama – Johnny Unitas Award (outstanding senior quarterback)
 CJ Mosley, Alabama – Dick Butkus Award (outstanding linebacker)
 Odell Beckham Jr., LSU – Paul Hornung Award (most versatile player)

All-Americans

QB – A. J. McCarron, Alabama (AFCA, WCFF)
RB – Tre Mason, Auburn  (TSN)
WR – Mike Evans, Texas A&M (AFCA, FWAA, WCFF, AP, USAT, CBS, ESPN, SI)
WR – Jordan Matthews, Vanderbilt (USAT, Athlon)
OL – Cyrus Kouandjio, Alabama (AFCA, FWAA, WCFF, AP, CBS, Athlon)
OL – Jake Matthews, Texas A&M (AFCA, FWAA, TSN, WCFF, AP, USAT, CBS, ESPN, SI, Athlon)
OL – Travis Swanson, Arkansas (USAT)
DL – Jadeveon Clowney, South Carolina (AFCA)
DL – Kelcy Quarles, South Carolina  (TSN)
DL – Michael Sam, Missouri (AFCA, FWAA, TSN, WCFF, AP, USAT, CBS, ESPN, SI, Athlon)
LB – C. J. Mosley, Alabama (AFCA, FWAA, TSN, WCFF, AP, USAT, CBS, ESPN, Athlon)
DB – Ha Ha Clinton-Dix, Alabama  (AFCA, FWAA, TSN, ESPN)
DB – Cody Prewitt, Ole Miss (AP, USAT)

2014 NFL Draft

N.B: In the explanations below, (D) denotes trades that took place during the 2014 Draft, while (PD) indicates trades completed pre-draft.

Round one

Round two

Round three

Round four

Round five

Round six

Round seven

Trade references

Home attendance

Games played at Arkansas' secondary home stadium War Memorial Stadium, capacity: 54,120.

Attendance was 84,693 for the WLOCP, an SEC home game played at a neutral site

References